Carlos Cordero may refer to:

 Carlos Cordero (runner) (born 1977), Mexican athlete
 Carlos Cordero (footballer) (born 1996), Spanish footballer